"Off the Record" is a song by British rapper Tinchy Stryder. The song features Scottish music producers Calvin Harris and Matt Burns (credited as BURNS). It was meant to be the second single from his fourth studio album, entitled Full Tank, but Full Tank was scrapped, so it became a non-album single. It was released on 4 November 2011 as a digital download. The song was co-written by Stryder and the production trio TMS, and was co-produced by Calvin Harris and BURNS, in August 2011. The single had its debut in BBC Radio 1Xtra's on 15 September 2011. The song peaked at number 24 on the UK Singles Chart. It is most notable for its appearance on the compilation album Now 80.

Background and release
"Off the Record" was written by Tinchy Stryder and the production trio TMS. TMS are the producers of Stryder's 2011 hit single "Spaceship" featuring Dappy, which reached number 5 on the UK Singles Chart, and Dappy's 2011 debut single "No Regrets", which topped the UK Singles Chart. The song was produced by the Three Six Zero Group duo of Calvin Harris and Matt Burns (credited as BURNS), in August 2011.

When speaking about working with Calvin Harris and how they both came to work together on the song, Stryder stated  in an interview with music journalist Kim Dawson of Daily Star newspaper:

According to an interview with music journalist, Lina Bastidas of PopDash website on 3 November 2011, Stryder stated that the track's lyrics were inspired by his life currently feeling like he is on a rollercoaster, at the time of the song production.

The song additionally makes reference to Calvin Harris' song "The Girls", when Tinchy Stryder sings, "Calvin gets the girls, he's got all the girls, ohh look.", as well as referencing Katy Perry's song I Kissed a Girl when he sings, "Her Katy Perry's awesome. She kissed a girl..."

Music video
The concept for the music video was based on the notorious phrase or saying of "What Happens in Vegas, Stays in Vegas". The music video was filmed in Las Vegas, Nevada, United States, by Tinchy Stryder's music video production partners Luke Monaghan & James Barber, to accompany the release of "Off  The Record". Monaghan and Barber were also two of the three directors of Stryder's 2011 Mobo Award winning music video for his previous 2011 hit single in the UK, "Spaceship".

Synopsis

The music video finds Stryder in a Red colored  Mustang driving, followed by him being on roller coaster at the MGM Grand Adventures Theme Park, with a group of females, whilst at the same time he proceeds with athemic choruses over electro house beats.

The second scene finds Stryder at the luxurious MGM Grand Las Vegas hotel, where he is first seen in the hotel casino gambling, then dawn has approached and he proceeds to his suite at the hotel, where there is a hotel party, and is accompanied by a group of females and cameo appearances from a few Ruff Sqwad members and the production trio TMS are made.

Once in the hotel suite he continues with the song choruses, whilst being on the bed in the hotel suite with a few females wearing Star In The Hood halternecks and monokini's, accompanying him on the bed, the females begin to have a pillow fight whilst fumbling Tinchy Stryder at the same time, then Stryder throws, US$1,000 banknotes, at the females accompanying him on the bed, before Stryder later begins to proceed with rhymes that comes thick and fast over futuristic post-dubstep beats, which is then proceeded by an X-rated footage of a naked female in a bathtub being covered with a bottle of Baileys Irish Cream.

The remaining final scenes in the music video are split with footages of a few members of the grime supergroup and production team Ruff Sqwad, production team TMS, and of Stryder celebrating his 25th birthday, dancing with a group of females on the balcony of an MGM Grand Las Vegas hotel suite, then finally closing the music video with him blowing out the candles on his Star In The Hood decorated Birthday cake.

The music video was released on Tinchy Stryder's Vevo via YouTube channel on 29 September 2011.

Live performances
On Wednesday, 5 October 2011, Tinchy Stryder performed the song live at the 2011 MOBO Awards (Music of Black Origin), which was held at the SECC (Scottish Exhibition and Conference Centre) in Glasgow, Scotland. On Sunday, 30 October 2011, Tinchy Stryder performed the song on the UK television show, The Xtra Factor.

Track listing

Chart performance

Release history

References

2011 singles
Synth-pop songs
Hip house songs
Post-dubstep songs
Tinchy Stryder songs
Songs with music by Tinchy Stryder
Calvin Harris songs
Burns (musician) songs
Takeover Entertainment singles